The 1998 British Open was a professional ranking snooker tournament, that was held from 2–12 April 1998 at the Plymouth Pavilions, Plymouth, England.
 
John Higgins won the tournament by defeating Stephen Hendry nine frames to eight in the final. The defending champion, Mark Williams, was defeated by Higgins in the semi-final.


Main draw

Final

References

British Open (snooker)
British Open
Open (snooker)